Eurya rapensis is a species of plant in the Pentaphylacaceae family. It is endemic to French Polynesia.

References

Endemic flora of French Polynesia
rapensis
Least concern plants
Taxonomy articles created by Polbot